The 1925 Denver Pioneers football team was an American football team that represented the University of Denver as a member of the Rocky Mountain Conference (RMC) during the 1925 college football season. In their first season under head coach Fred Dawson, the Pioneers compiled a 1–6 record (1–6 against conference opponents), finished 11th in the RMC, and were outscored by a total of 152 to 27.

Schedule

References

Denver
Denver Pioneers football seasons
Denver Pioneers football